Bahrlutia is a genus of  moths in the family Plutellidae.

Species
Bahrlutia ghorella Amsel, 1935
Bahrlutia schaeuffelei Amsel, 1959

References

Plutellidae